Nguyễn Hồng Sơn (born October 9, 1970) is a retired Vietnamese football player, who played for the Thể Công football club and the Vietnam national football team as an outside right and second striker. He is widely regarded to be one of the greatest Vietnamese players of all time.

Career
Nguyễn Hồng Sơn joined the Army Club (also known as "Thể Công") in 1988 and started to wear the national team in 1993. Initially, Hồng Sơn played in the striker position and then switched to wingers. . In 1990 Hồng Sơn won the title of top scorer of the national championship. He had won a silver medal at the 18th, 20th and SEA Games SEA Games, 1998 bronze medal in the Tiger 1996 Cup and SEA Games 19. In 1998, after receiving the "Tiger Cup Best Player" award, Nguyễn Hồng Sơn was awarded the title of Asia's best player of the month, August 1998 and "Vietnam Golden Ball" for the first time. In 1999, he took second place at the soccer tournament organized by Pepsi (This tournament includes many players such as David Beckham, Dwight Yorke, Rui Costa, Roberto Carlos, ...) In early 2001, He won The title "Vietnam Golden Ball" for the second time. Late V-League season 2002 Hồng Sơn announced retirement due to injury but in the second phase of the 2003 season, he returned to The Public Football team and then competed for Red Beer Workers. He is also an officer of the Vietnam People's Army, a rank of Lieutenant Colonel. [3]

After retiring from the competition, Nguyễn Hồng Sơn became a football coach leading Thanh Nghia Football Club - Quang Ngai, then the U15 team of Can Cong. At the 2007 Southeast Asian Games, he worked as a vice-coach for the Vietnamese national futsal team.

International goals

Honour

ASEAN Football Championship
Runner Up: 1998 Tiger Cup
Third Place: 1996 Tiger Cup
Fourth Place: 2000 Tiger Cup
SEA Games
Silver Medal: 1995 & 1999
Bronze Medal: 1997

Thể Công
V-League
Champion: 1990 & 1998
Vietnamese Super Cup
Champion: 1998

Personal awards
Vietnamese Golden Ball: 1998 & 2001
Top scorer V-League: 1990
MVP: 1998 Tiger Cup
Best player in Asia: August 1998

References

1970 births
Living people
Vietnamese footballers
Vietnam international footballers
Sportspeople from Hanoi
Southeast Asian Games silver medalists for Vietnam
Southeast Asian Games medalists in football
Viettel FC players
Association football midfielders
Competitors at the 1995 Southeast Asian Games
Competitors at the 1997 Southeast Asian Games
Competitors at the 1999 Southeast Asian Games
Footballers at the 1998 Asian Games
Asian Games competitors for Vietnam